Pholcus opilionoides is a species of spider in the family Pholcidae (cellar spiders) found in Europe, Egypt, the Caucasus and possibly Iran.

See also 
 List of Pholcidae species

References

External links 

Pholcidae
Spiders of Europe
Spiders of Asia
Fauna of Azerbaijan
Spiders described in 1781